The Mtetengwe River is a tributary of the Mzingwane River in Beitbridge District, Zimbabwe. There are two dams on its tributaries: Tongwe Dam on the Tongwe River, which provides water for an irrigation scheme, and Giraffe Dam which supplies water for cattle.

References

Rivers of Zimbabwe
Mzingwane River
Geography of Matabeleland South Province